Louis van Mauritius (died 1808) was a slave in the Cape Colony (now South Africa). Working as a tailor, he led a slave rebellion on 27 October 1808, in which over 300 slaves participated. The rebellion failed and 47 people were put on trial. Twenty, including van Mauritius, were sentenced to death.

An artwork commemorating the 200th anniversary of the rebellion was commissioned by the City of Cape Town and is on display in Church Square, near the old Slave Lodge in Cape Town.

References

Rebel slaves
Cape Colony
People executed by South Africa
Year of birth missing
1808 deaths
African slaves
19th-century slaves
19th-century executions
19th-century rebels